Luvsanlkhagvyn Dashnyam (born 15 May 1940) is a Mongolian speed skater. He competed at the 1964 Winter Olympics, the 1968 Winter Olympics and the 1972 Winter Olympics.

References

External links
 

1940 births
Living people
Mongolian male speed skaters
Olympic speed skaters of Mongolia
Speed skaters at the 1964 Winter Olympics
Speed skaters at the 1968 Winter Olympics
Speed skaters at the 1972 Winter Olympics
People from Bulgan Province
20th-century Mongolian people